Pape Malick Diop (born 29 December 1974) is a Senegalese former footballer who played as a defender. He played for Racing Strasbourg (France), Neuchâtel Xamax (Switzerland) and FC Lorient (France). At international level, he represented the Senegal national team and was a participant at the 2002 FIFA World Cup. He is often confused with Pape Seydou Diop who played limited games for Norwich City.

Whilst at Lorient Diop played in the 2002 Coupe de France Final in which they beat SC Bastia.

References

External links
 Prifile at LPF
 

1974 births
Living people
Senegalese footballers
Senegalese expatriate footballers
Senegal international footballers
French sportspeople of Senegalese descent
2002 FIFA World Cup players
ASC Jeanne d'Arc players
RC Strasbourg Alsace players
Neuchâtel Xamax FCS players
FC Lorient players
En Avant Guingamp players
FC Metz players
Swiss Super League players
Ligue 1 players
Ligue 2 players
Expatriate footballers in Switzerland
2000 African Cup of Nations players
2002 African Cup of Nations players
2004 African Cup of Nations players
Association football defenders